Cylindropsis is a genus of plants first described in 1898. It contains only one known species, Cylindropsis parvifolia, native to central Africa (Nigeria, Cabinda, Gabon, Central African Republic, Republic of Congo, Democratic Republic of the Congo).

formerly included
 Cylindropsis novoguineensis (Wernham) S.Moore ex Markgr. = Melodinus australis (F.Muell.) Pierre 
 Cylindropsis togolana Hallier f. = Landolphia togolana (Hallier f.) Pichon 
 Cylindropsis watsoniana (Rombouts) Hallier f = Landolphia watsoniana Rombouts

References

Monotypic Apocynaceae genera
Flora of Africa
Rauvolfioideae